Jorge Carlos Ledesma (14 September 1932 — 12 October 2001) was an Argentine amateur golfer. He is the brother of Pedro Ledesma, who is also an accomplished golfer.

Ledesma is known as one of the best amateur golfers in Argentina, being one of only 11 Argentinian golfers, and along with Juan Segura, the only two amateurs, to have played in the Masters Tournament. He also played in the U.S. Amateur.

Ledesma was born in Buenos Aires in 1932. He was raised in Mar del Plata, and developed his golfing skills at the Mar del Plata Golf Club beginning at age eight. He won the Argentine Open in 1963 ahead of Roberto De Vicenzo, and came in third the following year, while he also claimed the amateur title at the tournament on nine occasions between 1955 and 1976, including five in a row from 1960. He won Argentine Amateur Championship three times, in 1959, 1966 and 1967, and also finished second in 1962, 1963, and 1974.

Internationally, Ledesma won the 1956 Viña del mar Open in Chile, and finished second in the Brazil Open in 1967.

Ledesma died in Buenos Aires in 2001, at age 69.

Amateur wins (52)
1952 Gordon Kenneth Cup
1955 Amateur Argentine Open, South Open
1956 Viña del Mar Open (Chile), South Open, Gordon Kenneth Cup, Gold Cup Uruguay
1957 Amateur Argentine Open, Gold Cup Uruguay
1959 Argentine Amateur Championship
1960 Amateur Argentine Open, Raul Lottero Cup, South Open
1961 Amateur Argentine Open, Abierto del Litoral, South Open
1962 Amateur Argentine Open, Raul Lottero Cup, Gordon Kenneth Cup, Argentine Masters
1963 Amateur Argentine Open, South Open, Gordon Kenneth Cup, Chile Amateur Open
1964 Amateur Argentine Open, North Open, South Open, Gordon Kenneth Cup
1965 North Open, Raul Lottero Cup, Gordon Kenneth Cup
1966 Porto Alegre Open (Brazil), Raul Lottero Cup, Argentine Amateur Championship, Gordon Kenneth Cup
1967 Amateur Argentine Open, Porto Alegre Open (Brazil), Argentine Amateur Championship, Gordon Kenneth Cup, Argentine Masters, Brazil Amateur Open
1968 North Open, Raul Lottero Cup, South Open, Gordon Kenneth Cup
1970 South Open
1971 Raul Lottero Cup
1972 South Open
1973 Raul Lottero Cup
1974 Ledesma-Segura Cup
1976 Amateur Argentine Open
1980 Ledesma-Segura Cup

Professional wins (2)
1956 Viña del Mar Open (Chile)
1963 Argentine Open
* Both wins achieved as an amateur.

Team appearances
Amateur
 Eisenhower Trophy (7): 1958, 1960, 1962, 1964, 1968, 1970, 1974
 South American Cup (Los Andes Cup) (15): 1955(w), 1956(w), 1957(w), 1959(w), 1961(runner up), 1962(w), 1963(runner up), 1964(runner up), 1965(w), 1966(w), 1967(w), 1968, 1969(w), 1973(w), 1979
 Vigil Cup (Argentina): 1959–1982, team winner (10): 1959, 1960, 1961, 1962, 1963, 1964, 1965, 1970, 1978, 1980, individual winner (5): 1960, 1961, 1962, 1964, 1967.

References

Argentine male golfers
Amateur golfers
Argentine people of Spanish descent
Sportspeople from Mar del Plata
Burials at La Recoleta Cemetery
1932 births
2001 deaths